WDM may refer to:

 Science and technology

 Warm dark matter in cosmology
 Warm dense matter, a state of matter between solid and plasma
 Wavelength-division multiplexing, a signal transmission method
 Wax Deposition Modeling, an additive 3d printing technology
 wdm, the WINGs Display Manager on Unix
 Windows Driver Model, a framework for device drivers in Windows
 Wide Diesel Mixed, a series of Indian locomotives

 Other

 West Des Moines, Iowa, United States, a city
 Western Development Museum of Saskatchewan
 World Development Movement, a British campaign for social justice
 Waking Down in Mutuality, an American "spiritual awakening" association
 Warith Deen Muhammad (Wallace D. Muhammad), a leader of the Nation of Islam
 WDM (Washington, D.C.), an early 1920s radio station

he:ריבוב#WDM